The Silk Road was a network of Eurasian trade routes active from the second century BCE until the mid-15th century. Spanning over 6,400 kilometers (4,000 miles), it played a central role in facilitating economic, cultural, political, and religious interactions between the East and West. The name "Silk Road", first coined in the late 19th century, has fallen into disuse among some modern historians in favor of Silk Routes, on the grounds that it more accurately describes the intricate web of land and sea routes connecting East and Southeast Asia, the Indian subcontinent, Central Asia, the Middle East, East Africa and Europe.

The Silk Road derives its name from the highly lucrative trade of silk textiles that were produced almost exclusively in China. The network began with the Han dynasty's expansion into Central Asia around 114 BCE, which largely pacified the once untamed region. Imperial envoy Zhang Qian was commissioned to explore the unknown lands beyond the region in search of potential trading partners and allies. The information and goods gathered by these expeditions piqued Chinese interest and prompted formal diplomatic and commercial dispatches, as well as efforts to protect the routes with soldiers and an extension of the Great Wall. 

The expansion of the Parthian Empire, which stretched from eastern Anatolia to Afghanistan, provided a bridge to East Africa and the Mediterranean, particularly the nascent Roman Empire. By the early first century CE, Chinese silk was widely sought-after in Rome, Egypt, and Greece. Other lucrative commodities from the East included tea, dyes, perfumes, and porcelain; among Western exports were horses, camels, honey, wine, and gold. Aside from generating substantial wealth for emerging mercantile classes, the proliferation of goods such as paper and gunpowder greatly altered the trajectory of various realms, if not world history. 

During its roughly 1,500 years of existence, the Silk Road endured the rise and fall of numerous empires and major events such as the Black Death and the Mongol conquests; after almost every disruption, the network reemerged stronger than before, most notably under the Mongol Empire and its offshoot the Yuan Dynasty. As a highly decentralized network, security was sparse. Travelers faced constant threats of banditry and nomadic raiders, and long expanses of inhospitable terrain. Few individuals crossed the entirety of the Silk Road, instead relying on a succession of middlemen based at various stopping points along the way.

The Silk Road trade played a significant role in opening political and economic relations between China, Korea, Japan, India, Iran, Europe, the Horn of Africa and Arabia. In addition to goods, the network facilitated an unprecedented exchange of ideas, religions (especially Buddhism), philosophies, and scientific discoveries, many of which were syncretised or reshaped by the societies that encountered them. Likewise, a wide variety of people used the routes, including migrants, refugees, missionaries, artisans, diplomats, and soldiers. Diseases such as plague also spread along the Silk Road, possibly contributing to the Black Death. 

Despite repeatedly surviving many geopolitical changes and disruptions, the Silk Road abruptly lost its importance with the rise of the Ottoman Empire in 1453, which almost immediately severed trade between East and West. This prompted European efforts to seek alternative routes to Eastern riches, thereby ushering the Age of Discovery, European colonialism, and a more intensified process of globalization, which had arguably begun with the Silk Road. The network's influence survives into the 21st century. One of the world's best known historical figures, Marco Polo, was a Medieval Venetian merchant who was among the earliest Westerners to visit and describe the East. The name "New Silk Road" is used to describe several large infrastructure projects seeking to expand transportation along many of the historic trade routes; among the best known include the Eurasian Land Bridge and the Chinese Belt and Road Initiative (BRI). In June 2014, UNESCO designated the Chang'an-Tianshan corridor of the Silk Road as a World Heritage Site, while the Indian portion remains on the tentative site list.

Name

The Silk Road derives its name from the lucrative trade in silk, first developed in China, and a major reason for the connection of trade routes into an extensive transcontinental network. It derives from the German term  (literally "Silk Road") and was first popularized in 1877 by Ferdinand von Richthofen, who made seven expeditions to China from 1868 to 1872. However, the term itself had been in use in decades prior to that. The alternative translation "Silk Route" is also used occasionally. Although the term was coined in the 19th century, it did not gain widespread acceptance in academia or popularity among the public until the 20th century. The first book entitled The Silk Road was by Swedish geographer Sven Hedin in 1938.

The use of the term 'Silk Road' is not without its detractors. For instance, Warwick Ball contends that the maritime spice trade with India and Arabia was far more consequential for the economy of the Roman Empire than the silk trade with China, which at sea was conducted mostly through India and on land was handled by numerous intermediaries such as the Sogdians. Going as far as to call the whole thing a "myth" of modern academia, Ball argues that there was no coherent overland trade system and no free movement of goods from East Asia to the West until the period of the Mongol Empire. He notes that traditional authors discussing east–west trade such as Marco Polo and Edward Gibbon never labelled any route a "silk" one in particular.

The southern stretches of the Silk Road, from Khotan (Xinjiang) to Eastern China, were first used for jade and not silk, as long as 5000 BCE, and is still in use for this purpose. The term "Jade Road" would have been more appropriate than "Silk Road" had it not been for the far larger and geographically wider nature of the silk trade; the term is in current use in China.

Precursors

Chinese and Central Asian contacts (2nd millennium BCE)

Central Eurasia has been known from ancient times for its horse riding and horse breeding communities, and the overland Steppe Route across the northern steppes of Central Eurasia was in use long before that of the Silk Road. Archeological sites such as the Berel burial ground in Kazakhstan, confirmed that the nomadic Arimaspians were not only breeding horses for trade but also produced great craftsmen able to propagate exquisite art pieces along the Silk Road. From the 2nd millennium BCE, nephrite jade was being traded from mines in the region of Yarkand and Khotan to China. Significantly, these mines were not very far from the lapis lazuli and spinel ("Balas Ruby") mines in Badakhshan, and, although separated by the formidable Pamir Mountains, routes across them were apparently in use from very early times.

These mummified remains may have been of people who spoke Indo-European languages, which remained in use in the Tarim Basin, in the modern day Xinjiang region, until replaced by Turkic influences from the Xiongnu culture to the north and by Chinese influences from the eastern Han dynasty, who spoke a Sino-Tibetan language.

Some remnants of what was probably Chinese silk dating from 1070 BCE have been found in Ancient Egypt. The Great Oasis cities of Central Asia played a crucial role in the effective functioning of the Silk Road trade. The originating source seems sufficiently reliable, but silk degrades very rapidly, so it cannot be verified whether it was cultivated silk (which almost certainly came from China) or a type of wild silk, which might have come from the Mediterranean or Middle East.

Following contacts between Metropolitan China and nomadic western border territories in the 8th century BCE, gold was introduced from Central Asia, and Chinese jade carvers began to make imitation designs of the steppes, adopting the Scythian-style animal art of the steppes (depictions of animals locked in combat). This style is particularly reflected in the rectangular belt plaques made of gold and bronze, with other versions in jade and steatite. An elite burial near Stuttgart, Germany, dated to the 6th century BCE, was excavated and found to have not only Greek bronzes but also Chinese silks. Similar animal-shaped pieces of art and wrestler motifs on belts have been found in Scythian grave sites stretching from the Black Sea region all the way to Warring States era archaeological sites in Inner Mongolia (at Aluchaideng) and Shaanxi (at ) in China.

The expansion of Scythian cultures, stretching from the Hungarian plain and the Carpathian Mountains to the Chinese Kansu Corridor, and linking the Middle East with Northern India and the Punjab, undoubtedly played an important role in the development of the Silk Road. Scythians accompanied the Assyrian Esarhaddon on his invasion of Egypt, and their distinctive triangular arrowheads have been found as far south as Aswan. These nomadic peoples were dependent upon neighbouring settled populations for a number of important technologies, and in addition to raiding vulnerable settlements for these commodities, they also encouraged long-distance merchants as a source of income through the enforced payment of tariffs. Sogdians played a major role in facilitating trade between China and Central Asia along the Silk Roads as late as the 10th century, their language serving as a lingua franca for Asian trade as far back as the 4th century.

Persian Royal Road (500–330 BCE)

It was maintained and protected by the Achaemenid Empire (c. 500–330 BCE) and had postal stations and relays at regular intervals. By having fresh horses and riders ready at each relay, royal couriers could carry messages and traverse the length of the road in nine days, while normal travelers took about three months.

Expansion of the Greek Empire (329 BCE–10 CE)

The next major step toward the development of the Silk Road was the expansion of the Macedonian empire of Alexander the Great into Central Asia. In August 329 BCE, at the mouth of the Fergana Valley, he founded the city of Alexandria Eschate or "Alexandria The Furthest".

The Greeks remained in Central Asia for the next three centuries, first through the administration of the Seleucid Empire, and then with the establishment of the Greco-Bactrian Kingdom (250–125 BCE) in Bactria (modern Afghanistan, Tajikistan, and Pakistan) and the later Indo-Greek Kingdom (180 BCE – 10 CE) in modern Northern Pakistan and Afghanistan. They continued to expand eastward, especially during the reign of Euthydemus (230–200 BCE), who extended his control beyond Alexandria Eschate to Sogdiana. There are indications that he may have led expeditions as far as Kashgar on the western edge of the Taklamakan Desert, leading to the first known contacts between China and the West around 200 BCE. The Greek historian Strabo writes, "they extended their empire even as far as the Seres (China) and the Phryni."

Classical Greek philosophy syncretised with Indian philosophy.

Initiation in China (130 BCE)

The Silk Road was initiated and spread by China's Han dynasty through exploration and conquests in Central Asia. With the Mediterranean linked to the Fergana Valley, the next step was to open a route across the Tarim Basin and the Hexi Corridor to China Proper. This extension came around 130 BCE, with the embassies of the Han dynasty to Central Asia following the reports of the ambassador Zhang Qian (who was originally sent to obtain an alliance with the Yuezhi against the Xiongnu). Zhang Qian visited directly the kingdom of Dayuan in Ferghana, the territories of the Yuezhi in Transoxiana, the Bactrian country of Daxia with its remnants of Greco-Bactrian rule, and Kangju. He also made reports on neighbouring countries that he did not visit, such as Anxi (Parthia), Tiaozhi (Mesopotamia), Shendu (Indian subcontinent) and the Wusun. Zhang Qian's report suggested the economic reason for Chinese expansion and wall-building westward, and trail-blazed the Silk Road, making it one of the most famous trade routes in history and in the world.

After winning the War of the Heavenly Horses and the Han–Xiongnu War, Chinese armies established themselves in Central Asia, initiating the Silk Route as a major avenue of international trade. Some say that the Chinese Emperor Wu became interested in developing commercial relationships with the sophisticated urban civilizations of Ferghana, Bactria, and the Parthian Empire: "The Son of Heaven on hearing all this reasoned thus: Ferghana (Dayuan "Great Ionians") and the possessions of Bactria (Ta-Hsia) and Parthian Empire (Anxi) are large countries, full of rare things, with a population living in fixed abodes and given to occupations somewhat identical with those of the Chinese people, but with weak armies, and placing great value on the rich produce of China" (Hou Hanshu, Later Han History). Others say that Emperor Wu was mainly interested in fighting the Xiongnu and that major trade began only after the Chinese pacified the Hexi Corridor. The Silk Roads' origin lay in the hands of the Chinese. The soil in China lacked Selenium, a deficiency which contributed to muscular weakness and reduced growth in horses. Consequently, horses in China were too frail to support the weight of a Chinese soldier. The Chinese needed the superior horses that nomads bred on the Eurasian steppes, and nomads wanted things only agricultural societies produced, such as grain and silk. Even after the construction of the Great Wall, nomads gathered at the gates of the wall to exchange. Soldiers sent to guard the wall were often paid in silk which they traded with the nomads. Past its inception, the Chinese continued to dominate the Silk Roads, a process which was accelerated when "China snatched control of the Silk Road from the Hsiung-nu" and the Chinese general Cheng Ki "installed himself as protector of the Tarim at Wu-lei, situated between Kara Shahr and Kucha." "China's control of the Silk Road at the time of the later Han, by ensuring the freedom of transcontinental trade along the double chain of oases north and south of the Tarim, favoured the dissemination of Buddhism in the river basin, and with it Indian literature and Hellenistic art."

The Chinese were also strongly attracted by the tall and powerful horses (named "Heavenly horses") in the possession of the Dayuan (literally the "Great Ionians", the Greek kingdoms of Central Asia), which were of capital importance in fighting the nomadic Xiongnu. They defeated the Dayuan in the Han-Dayuan war. The Chinese subsequently sent numerous embassies, around ten every year, to these countries and as far as Seleucid Syria. Thus more embassies were dispatched to Anxi [Parthia], Yancai [who later joined the Alans ], Lijian [Syria under the Greek Seleucids], Tiaozhi (Mesopotamia), and Tianzhu [northwestern India]... As a rule, rather more than ten such missions went forward in the course of a year, and at the least five or six. (Hou Hanshu, Later Han History). These connections marked the beginning of the Silk Road trade network that extended to the Roman Empire.

The Chinese campaigned in Central Asia on several occasions, and direct encounters between Han troops and Roman legionaries (probably captured or recruited as mercenaries by the Xiong Nu) are recorded, particularly in the 36 BCE battle of Sogdiana (Joseph Needham, Sidney Shapiro). It has been suggested that the Chinese crossbow was transmitted to the Roman world on such occasions, although the Greek gastraphetes provides an alternative origin. R. Ernest Dupuy and Trevor N. Dupuy suggest that in 36 BCE,[A] Han expedition into Central Asia, west of Jaxartes River, apparently encountered and defeated a contingent of Roman legionaries. The Romans may have been part of Antony's army invading Parthia. Sogdiana (modern Bukhara), east of the Oxus River, on the Polytimetus River, was apparently the most easterly penetration ever made by Roman forces in Asia. The margin of Chinese victory appears to have been their crossbows, whose bolts and darts seem easily to have penetrated Roman shields and armour. The Roman historian Florus also describes the visit of numerous envoys, which included Seres (China), to the first Roman Emperor Augustus, who reigned between 27 BCE and 14 CE:

The Han Dynasty army regularly policed the trade route against nomadic bandit forces generally identified as Xiongnu. Han general Ban Chao led an army of 70,000 mounted infantry and light cavalry troops in the 1st century CE to secure the trade routes, reaching far west to the Tarim Basin. Ban Chao expanded his conquests across the Pamirs to the shores of the Caspian Sea and the borders of Parthia. It was from here that the Han general dispatched envoy Gan Ying to Daqin (Rome). The Silk Road essentially came into being from the 1st century BCE, following these efforts by China to consolidate a road to the Western world and India, both through direct settlements in the area of the Tarim Basin and diplomatic relations with the countries of the Dayuan, Parthians and Bactrians further west. The Silk Roads were a "complex network of trade routes" that gave people the chance to exchange goods and culture.

A maritime Silk Route opened up between Chinese-controlled Giao Chỉ (centred in modern Vietnam, near Hanoi), probably by the 1st century. It extended, via ports on the coasts of India and Sri Lanka, all the way to Roman-controlled ports in Roman Egypt and the Nabataean territories on the northeastern coast of the Red Sea. The earliest Roman glassware bowl found in China was unearthed from a Western Han tomb in Guangzhou, dated to the early 1st century BCE, indicating that Roman commercial items were being imported through the South China Sea. According to Chinese dynastic histories, it is from this region that the Roman embassies arrived in China, beginning in 166 CE during the reigns of Marcus Aurelius and Emperor Huan of Han. Other Roman glasswares have been found in Eastern-Han-era tombs (25–220 CE) more further inland in Nanjing and Luoyang.

P.O. Harper asserts that a 2nd or 3rd-century Roman gilt silver plate found in Jingyuan, Gansu, China with a central image of the Greco-Roman god Dionysus resting on a feline creature, most likely came via Greater Iran (i.e. Sogdiana). Valerie Hansen (2012) believed that earliest Roman coins found in China date to the 4th century, during Late Antiquity and the Dominate period, and come from the Byzantine Empire. However, Warwick Ball (2016) highlights the recent discovery of sixteen Principate-era Roman coins found in Xi'an (formerly Chang'an, one of the two Han capitals) that were minted during the reigns of Roman emperors spanning from Tiberius to Aurelian (i.e. 1st to 3rd centuries CE).

Helen Wang points out that although these coins were found in China, they were deposited there in the twentieth century, not in ancient times, and therefore do not shed light on historic contacts between China and Rome. Roman golden medallions made during the reign of Antoninus Pius and quite possibly his successor Marcus Aurelius have been found at Óc Eo in southern Vietnam, which was then part of the Kingdom of Funan bordering the Chinese province of Jiaozhi in northern Vietnam. Given the archaeological finds of Mediterranean artefacts made by Louis Malleret in the 1940s, Óc Eo may have been the same site as the port city of Kattigara described by Ptolemy in his Geography (c. 150 CE), although Ferdinand von Richthofen had previously believed it was closer to Hanoi.

Evolution

Roman Empire (30 BCE–3rd century CE)

Soon after the Roman conquest of Egypt in 30 BCE, regular communications and trade between China, Southeast Asia, India, the Middle East, Africa, and Europe blossomed on an unprecedented scale. The Roman Empire inherited eastern trade routes that were part of the Silk Road from the earlier Hellenistic powers and the Arabs. With control of these trade routes, citizens of the Roman Empire received new luxuries and greater prosperity for the Empire as a whole. The Roman-style glassware discovered in the archeological sites of Gyeongju, the capital of the Silla kingdom (Korea) showed that Roman artifacts were traded as far as the Korean peninsula. The Greco-Roman trade with India started by Eudoxus of Cyzicus in 130 BCE continued to increase, and according to Strabo (II.5.12), by the time of Augustus, up to 120 ships were setting sail every year from Myos Hormos in Roman Egypt to India. The Roman Empire connected with the Central Asian Silk Road through their ports in Barygaza (known today as Bharuch) and Barbaricum (known today as the city of Karachi, Sindh, Pakistan) and continued along the western coast of India. An ancient "travel guide" to this Indian Ocean trade route was the Greek Periplus of the Erythraean Sea written in 60 CE.

The travelling party of Maës Titianus penetrated farthest east along the Silk Road from the Mediterranean world, probably with the aim of regularising contacts and reducing the role of middlemen, during one of the lulls in Rome's intermittent wars with Parthia, which repeatedly obstructed movement along the Silk Road. Intercontinental trade and communication became regular, organised, and protected by the "Great Powers". Intense trade with the Roman Empire soon followed, confirmed by the Roman craze for Chinese silk (supplied through the Parthians), even though the Romans thought silk was obtained from trees. This belief was affirmed by Seneca the Younger in his Phaedra and by Virgil in his Georgics. Notably, Pliny the Elder knew better. Speaking of the bombyx or silk moth, he wrote in his Natural Histories "They weave webs, like spiders, that become a luxurious clothing material for women, called silk." The Romans traded spices, glassware, perfumes, and silk.

Roman artisans began to replace yarn with valuable plain silk cloths from China and the Silla Kingdom in Gyeongju, Korea. Chinese wealth grew as they delivered silk and other luxury goods to the Roman Empire, whose wealthy women admired their beauty. The Roman Senate issued, in vain, several edicts to prohibit the wearing of silk, on economic and moral grounds: the import of Chinese silk caused a huge outflow of gold, and silk clothes were considered decadent and immoral.

The Western Roman Empire, and its demand for sophisticated Asian products, collapsed in the fifth century.

The unification of Central Asia and Northern India within the Kushan Empire between the first and third centuries reinforced the role of the powerful merchants from Bactria and Taxila. They fostered multi-cultural interaction as indicated by their 2nd century treasure hoards filled with products from the Greco-Roman world, China, and India, such as in the archeological site of Begram.

Byzantine Empire (6th–14th centuries)

Byzantine Greek historian Procopius stated that two Nestorian Christian monks eventually uncovered the way silk was made. From this revelation, monks were sent by the Byzantine Emperor Justinian (ruled 527–565) as spies on the Silk Road from Constantinople to China and back to steal the silkworm eggs, resulting in silk production in the Mediterranean, particularly in Thrace in northern Greece, and giving the Byzantine Empire a monopoly on silk production in medieval Europe. In 568 the Byzantine ruler Justin II was greeted by a Sogdian embassy representing Istämi, ruler of the First Turkic Khaganate, who formed an alliance with the Byzantines against Khosrow I of the Sasanian Empire that allowed the Byzantines to bypass the Sasanian merchants and trade directly with the Sogdians for purchasing Chinese silk. Although the Byzantines had already procured silkworm eggs from China by this point, the quality of Chinese silk was still far greater than anything produced in the West, a fact that is perhaps emphasized by the discovery of coins minted by Justin II found in a Chinese tomb of Shanxi province dated to the Sui dynasty (581–618).

Both the Old Book of Tang and New Book of Tang, covering the history of the Chinese Tang dynasty (618–907), record that a new state called Fu-lin (拂菻; i.e. Byzantine Empire) was virtually identical to the previous Daqin (大秦; i.e. Roman Empire). Several Fu-lin embassies were recorded for the Tang period, starting in 643 with an alleged embassy by Constans II (transliterated as Bo duo li, 波多力, from his nickname "Kōnstantinos Pogonatos") to the court of Emperor Taizong of Tang. The History of Song describes the final embassy and its arrival in 1081, apparently sent by Michael VII Doukas (transliterated as Mie li yi ling kai sa, 滅力伊靈改撒, from his name and title Michael VII Parapinakēs Caesar) to the court of Emperor Shenzong of the Song dynasty (960–1279). 

However, the History of Yuan claims that a Byzantine man became a leading astronomer and physician in Khanbaliq, at the court of Kublai Khan, Mongol founder of the Yuan dynasty (1271–1368) and was even granted the noble title 'Prince of Fu lin' (Chinese: 拂菻王; Fú lǐn wáng). The Uyghur Nestorian Christian diplomat Rabban Bar Sauma, who set out from his Chinese home in Khanbaliq (Beijing) and acted as a representative for Arghun (a grandnephew of Kublai Khan), traveled throughout Europe and attempted to secure military alliances with Edward I of England, Philip IV of France, Pope Nicholas IV, as well as the Byzantine ruler Andronikos II Palaiologos. Andronikos II had two half-sisters who were married to great-grandsons of Genghis Khan, which made him an in-law with the Yuan-dynasty Mongol ruler in Beijing, Kublai Khan. 

The History of Ming preserves an account where the Hongwu Emperor, after founding the Ming dynasty (1368–1644), had a supposed Byzantine merchant named Nieh-ku-lun (捏古倫) deliver his proclamation about the establishment of a new dynasty to the Byzantine court of John V Palaiologos in September 1371. Friedrich Hirth (1885), Emil Bretschneider (1888), and more recently Edward Luttwak (2009) presumed that this was none other than Nicolaus de Bentra, a Roman Catholic bishop of Khanbilaq chosen by Pope John XXII to replace the previous archbishop John of Montecorvino.

Tang dynasty (7th century)

Although the Silk Road was initially formulated during the reign of Emperor Wu of Han (141–87 BCE), it was reopened by the Tang Empire in 639 when Hou Junji conquered the Western Regions, and remained open for almost four decades. It was closed after the Tibetans captured it in 678, but in 699, during Empress Wu's period, the Silk Road reopened when the Tang reconquered the Four Garrisons of Anxi originally installed in 640, once again connecting China directly to the West for land-based trade. The Tang captured the vital route through the Gilgit Valley from Tibet in 722, lost it to the Tibetans in 737, and regained it under the command of the Goguryeo-Korean General Gao Xianzhi.

While the Turks were settled in the Ordos region (former territory of the Xiongnu), the Tang government took on the military policy of dominating the central steppe. The Tang dynasty (along with Turkic allies) conquered and subdued Central Asia during the 640s and 650s. During Emperor Taizong's reign alone, large campaigns were launched against not only the Göktürks, but also separate campaigns against the Tuyuhun, the oasis states, and the Xueyantuo. Under Emperor Taizong, Tang general Li Jing conquered the Eastern Turkic Khaganate. Under Emperor Gaozong, Tang general Su Dingfang conquered the Western Turkic Khaganate, an important ally of the Byzantine empire. After these conquests, the Tang dynasty fully controlled the Xiyu, which was the strategic location astride the Silk Road. This led the Tang dynasty to reopen the Silk Road, with this portion named the Tang-Tubo Road ("Tang-Tibet Road") in many historical texts.

The Tang dynasty established a second Pax Sinica, and the Silk Road reached its golden age, whereby Persian and Sogdian merchants benefited from the commerce between East and West. At the same time, the Chinese empire welcomed foreign cultures, making it very cosmopolitan in its urban centres. In addition to the land route, the Tang dynasty also developed the maritime Silk Route. Chinese envoys had been sailing through the Indian Ocean to India since perhaps the 2nd century BCE, yet it was during the Tang dynasty that a strong Chinese maritime presence could be found in the Persian Gulf and Red Sea into Persia, Mesopotamia (sailing up the Euphrates River in modern-day Iraq), Arabia, Egypt, Aksum (Ethiopia), and Somalia in the Horn of Africa.

Sogdian–Türkic tribes (4th–8th centuries)

The Silk Road represents an early phenomenon of political and cultural integration due to inter-regional trade. In its heyday, it sustained an international culture that strung together groups as diverse as the Magyars, Armenians, and Chinese. The Silk Road reached its peak in the west during the time of the Byzantine Empire; in the Nile-Oxus section, from the Sassanid Empire period to the Il Khanate period; and in the sinitic zone from the Three Kingdoms period to the Yuan dynasty period. Trade between East and West also developed across the Indian Ocean, between Alexandria in Egypt and Guangzhou in China. Persian Sassanid coins emerged as a means of currency, just as valuable as silk yarn and textiles.

Under its strong integrating dynamics on the one hand and the impacts of change it transmitted on the other, tribal societies previously living in isolation along the Silk Road, and pastoralists who were of barbarian cultural development, were drawn to the riches and opportunities of the civilisations connected by the routes, taking on the trades of marauders or mercenaries. "Many barbarian tribes became skilled warriors able to conquer rich cities and fertile lands and to forge strong military empires."

The Sogdians dominated the east–west trade after the 4th century up to the 8th century. They were the main caravan merchants of Central Asia. A.V. Dybo noted that "according to historians, the main driving force of the Great Silk Road were not just Sogdians, but the carriers of a mixed Sogdian-Türkic culture that often came from mixed families."

The Silk Road gave rise to the clusters of military states of nomadic origins in North China, ushered the Nestorian, Manichaean, Buddhist, and later Islamic religions into Central Asia and China.

Islamic era (8th–13th centuries)

By the Umayyad era, Damascus had overtaken Ctesiphon as a major trade center until the Abbasid dynasty built the city of Baghdad, which became the most important city along the silk road.

At the end of its glory, the routes brought about the largest continental empire ever, the Mongol Empire, with its political centres strung along the Silk Road (Beijing) in North China, Karakorum in central Mongolia, Sarmakhand in Transoxiana, Tabriz in Northern Iran, realising the political unification of zones previously loosely and intermittently connected by material and cultural goods.

The Islamic world expanded into Central Asia during the 8th century, under the Umayyad Caliphate, while its successor the Abbasid Caliphate put a halt to Chinese westward expansion at the Battle of Talas in 751 (near the Talas River in modern-day Kyrgyzstan). However, following the disastrous An Lushan Rebellion (755–763) and the conquest of the Western Regions by the Tibetan Empire, the Tang Empire was unable to reassert its control over Central Asia. Contemporary Tang authors noted how the dynasty had gone into decline after this point. In 848 the Tang Chinese, led by the commander Zhang Yichao, were only able to reclaim the Hexi Corridor and Dunhuang in Gansu from the Tibetans. The Persian Samanid Empire (819–999) centered in Bukhara (Uzbekistan) continued the trade legacy of the Sogdians. The disruptions of trade were curtailed in that part of the world by the end of the 10th century and conquests of Central Asia by the Turkic Islamic Kara-Khanid Khanate, yet Nestorian Christianity, Zoroastrianism, Manichaeism, and Buddhism in Central Asia virtually disappeared.

During the early 13th century Khwarezmia was invaded by the Mongol Empire. The Mongol ruler Genghis Khan had the once vibrant cities of Bukhara and Samarkand burned to the ground after besieging them. However, in 1370 Samarkand saw a revival as the capital of the new Timurid Empire. The Turko-Mongol ruler Timur forcefully moved artisans and intellectuals from across Asia to Samarkand, making it one of the most important trade centers and cultural entrepôts of the Islamic world.

Mongol empire (13th–14th centuries)

The Mongol expansion throughout the Asian continent from around 1207 to 1360 helped bring political stability and re-established the Silk Road (via Karakorum and Khanbaliq). It also brought an end to the dominance of the Islamic Caliphate over world trade. Because the Mongols came to control the trade routes, trade circulated throughout the region, though they never abandoned their nomadic lifestyle.

The Mongol rulers wanted to establish their capital on the Central Asian steppe, so to accomplish this goal, after every conquest they enlisted local people (traders, scholars, artisans) to help them construct and manage their empire. The Mongols developed overland and maritime routes throughout the Eurasian continent, Black Sea and the Mediterranean in the west, and the Indian Ocean in the south. In the second half of the thirteenth century Mongol-sponsored business partnerships flourished in the Indian Ocean connecting Mongol Middle East and Mongol China

The Mongol diplomat Rabban Bar Sauma visited the courts of Europe in 1287–88 and provided a detailed written report to the Mongols. Around the same time, the Venetian explorer Marco Polo became one of the first Europeans to travel the Silk Road to China. His tales, documented in The Travels of Marco Polo, opened Western eyes to some of the customs of the Far East. He was not the first to bring back stories, but he was one of the most widely read. He had been preceded by numerous Christian missionaries to the East, such as William of Rubruck, Benedykt Polak, Giovanni da Pian del Carpine, and Andrew of Longjumeau. Later envoys included Odoric of Pordenone, Giovanni de' Marignolli, John of Montecorvino, Niccolò de' Conti, and Ibn Battuta, a Moroccan Muslim traveller who passed through the present-day Middle East and across the Silk Road from Tabriz between 1325 and 1354.

In the 13th century, efforts were made at forming a Franco-Mongol alliance, with an exchange of ambassadors and (failed) attempts at military collaboration in the Holy Land during the later Crusades. Eventually, the Mongols in the Ilkhanate, after they had destroyed the Abbasid and Ayyubid dynasties, converted to Islam and signed the 1323 Treaty of Aleppo with the surviving Muslim power, the Egyptian Mamluks.

Some studies indicate that the Black Death, which devastated Europe starting in the late 1340s, may have reached Europe from Central Asia (or China) along the trade routes of the Mongol Empire. One theory holds that Genoese traders coming from the entrepot of Trebizond in northern Turkey carried the disease to Western Europe; like many other outbreaks of plague, there is strong evidence that it originated in marmots in Central Asia and was carried westwards to the Black Sea by Silk Road traders.

Decline and disintegration (15th century)

The fragmentation of the Mongol Empire loosened the political, cultural, and economic unity of the Silk Road. Turkmeni marching lords seized land around the western part of the Silk Road from the decaying Byzantine Empire. After the fall of the Mongol Empire, the great political powers along the Silk Road became economically and culturally separated. Accompanying the crystallisation of regional states was the decline of nomad power, partly due to the devastation of the Black Death and partly due to the encroachment of sedentary civilisations equipped with gunpowder.

Partial revival in West Asia
Significant is Armenians role in making Europe Asia trade possible by being located in the crossing roads between these two. Armenia had a monopoly on almost all trade roads in this area and a colossal network. From 1700 to 1765, the total export of Persian silk was entirely conducted by Armenians. They were also exporting raisins, coffee beans, figs, Turkish yarn, camel hair, various precious stones, rice, etc., from Turkey and Iran.

Collapse (18th century)

The silk trade continued to flourish until it was disrupted by the collapse of the Safavid Empire in the 1720s.

New Silk Road (20th–21st centuries)

In the 20th century, the Silk Road through the Suez Canal and the overland connections were repeatedly blocked from the First World War on. This also applied to the massive trade barriers of the Cold War. It was not until the 1990s that the "old" trade routes began to reactivate again. In addition to the Chinese activities and the integration of Africa, this also applies to the increasing importance of the Mediterranean region and the connection to Central Europe such as the trade center of Trieste.

Trade along the Silk Road could soon account for almost 40% of total world trade, with a large part taking place by sea. The land route of the Silk Road seems to remain a niche project in terms of transport volume in the future. As a result of the Chinese Silk Road Initiative and investments, trade seems to be intensifying on the relevant routes.

Maritime Silk Road

The maritime Silk Road follows the old trade route that was opened by the Chinese admiral Zheng He during the early Ming Dynasty. In particular, the establishment of the lockless Suez Canal then strongly promoted maritime trade between Asia and Europe in this area. While many trade flows were interrupted in the 20th century by the World Wars, the Suez Crisis and the Cold War, from the beginning of the 21st century many of the trading centers that had already existed in the 19th century were activated again.

The Suez Canal was also continually expanded and its time-saving role in Asia-Europe trade was highlighted. At the beginning of the Maritime Silk Road are the major Chinese ports in Shanghai, Shenzhen and Ningbo-Zhoushan. The Chinese investments in Africa will connect large areas of Central and East Africa to the maritime Silk Road and thus to China and directly to southern Europe via the Suez Canal. The increasing importance of the Mediterranean as a trading center with its direct, fast connections to Central and Eastern Europe is evident from the international investments in port cities of Piraeus and Trieste. Trieste in particular plays a major role in the economic zone in Central Europe known as the Blue Banana. This includes a banana-shaped corridor from southern England via the Benelux region, western Germany and Switzerland to northern Italy. The transport via Trieste instead of northern ports such as Rotterdam and Hamburg shortens the delivery time from Shanghai by ten days and from Hong Kong by nine days. On the maritime Silk Road, on which more than half of all containers in the world are already on the move, deep-water ports are being expanded, logistics hubs are being built and new transport routes such as railways and roads in the hinterland are being created.

Today the maritime silk road runs with its connections from the Chinese coast to the south via Hanoi to Jakarta, Singapore and Kuala Lumpur through the Strait of Malacca via the Sri Lankan Colombo towards the southern tip of India via Malé, the capital of the Maldives, to the East African Mombasa, from there to Djibouti, then through the Red Sea via the Suez Canal to the Mediterranean, there via Haifa, Istanbul and Athens to the Upper Adriatic region to the northern Italian hub of Trieste with its international free port and its rail connections to Central Europe and the North Sea. As a result, Poland, the Baltic States, Northern Europe and Central Europe are also connected to the maritime silk road.

Railway (1990)

The Eurasian Land Bridge, a railway through China, Kazakhstan, Mongolia and Russia, is sometimes referred to as the "New Silk Road". The last link in one of these two railway routes was completed in 1990, when the railway systems of China and Kazakhstan connected at Alataw Pass (Alashan Kou). In 2008 the line was used to connect the cities of Ürümqi in China's Xinjiang Province to Almaty and Astana in Kazakhstan. In October 2008 the first Trans-Eurasia Logistics train reached Hamburg from Xiangtan. Starting in July 2011 the line has been used by a freight service that connects Chongqing, China with Duisburg, Germany, cutting travel time for cargo from about 36 days by container ship to just 13 days by freight train. In 2013, Hewlett-Packard began moving large freight trains of laptop computers and monitors along this rail route. In January 2017, the service sent its first train to London. The network additionally connects to Madrid and Milan.

Revival of cities (1966) and Other Later 20th Century Travel
After an earthquake that hit Tashkent in Central Asia in 1966, the city had to rebuild itself. Although it took a huge toll on their markets, this commenced a revival of modern silk road cities.

It was also in this general period (late 1950s-late 1970s) that the Hippie trail followed parts of the Silk Road, particularly in Turkey and Iran, as thousands of travelers went overland from Europe to India.  Into the next century tours and other individual travel has occurred on some of the route, though for political and safety considerations mainly through Central Asia.

Belt and Road Initiative (2013)

During a September 2013 a visit to Kazakhstan, China's Chinese President Xi Jinping introduced a plan for a New Silk Road from China to Europe. The latest iterations of this plan, dubbed the "Belt and Road Initiative" (BRI), includes a land-based Silk Road Economic Belt and a 21st Century Maritime Silk Road, with primary points in Ürümqi, Dostyk, Nur-Sultan, Gomel, the Belarusian city of Brest, and the Polish cities of Małaszewicze and Łódź—which would be hubs of logistics and transshipment to other countries of Europe.

On 15 February 2016, with a change in routing, the first train dispatched under the scheme arrived from eastern Zhejiang Province to Tehran. Though this section does not complete the Silk Road–style overland connection between China and Europe, but new railway line connecting China to Europe via Istanbul's has now been established. The actual route went through Almaty, Bishkek, Samarkand, and Dushanbe.

Routes

The Silk Road consisted of several routes. As it extended westwards from the ancient commercial centres of China, the overland, intercontinental Silk Road divided into northern and southern routes bypassing the Taklamakan Desert and Lop Nur. Merchants along these routes were involved in "relay trade" in which goods changed "hands many times before reaching their final destinations."

Northern route

The northern route started at Chang'an (now called Xi'an), an ancient capital of China that was moved further east during the Later Han to Luoyang. The route was defined around the 1st century BCE when Han Wudi put an end to harassment by nomadic tribes.

The northern route travelled northwest through the Chinese province of Gansu from Shaanxi Province and split into three further routes, two of them following the mountain ranges to the north and south of the Taklamakan Desert to rejoin at Kashgar, and the other going north of the Tian Shan mountains through Turpan, Talgar, and Almaty (in what is now southeast Kazakhstan). The routes split again west of Kashgar, with a southern branch heading down the Alai Valley towards Termez (in modern Uzbekistan) and Balkh (Afghanistan), while the other travelled through Kokand in the Fergana Valley (in present-day eastern Uzbekistan) and then west across the Karakum Desert. Both routes joined the main southern route before reaching ancient Merv, Turkmenistan. Another branch of the northern route turned northwest past the Aral Sea and north of the Caspian Sea, then and on to the Black Sea.

A route for caravans, the northern Silk Road brought to China many goods such as "dates, saffron powder and pistachio nuts from Persia; frankincense, aloes and myrrh from Somalia; sandalwood from India; glass bottles from Egypt, and other expensive and desirable goods from other parts of the world." In exchange, the caravans sent back bolts of silk brocade, lacquer-ware, and porcelain.

Southern route
The southern route or Karakoram route was mainly a single route from China through the Karakoram mountains, where it persists in modern times as the Karakoram Highway, a paved road that connects Pakistan and China. It then set off westwards, but with southward spurs so travelers could complete the journey by sea from various points. Crossing the high mountains, it passed through northern Pakistan, over the Hindu Kush mountains, and into Afghanistan, rejoining the northern route near Merv, Turkmenistan. From Merv, it followed a nearly straight line west through mountainous northern Iran, Mesopotamia, and the northern tip of the Syrian Desert to the Levant, where Mediterranean trading ships plied regular routes to Italy, while land routes went either north through Anatolia or south to North Africa. Another branch road travelled from Herat through Susa to Charax Spasinu at the head of the Persian Gulf and across to Petra and on to Alexandria and other eastern Mediterranean ports from where ships carried the cargoes to Rome.

Southwestern route

The southwestern route is believed to be the Ganges/Brahmaputra Delta, which has been the subject of international interest for over two millennia. Strabo, the 1st-century Roman writer, mentions the deltaic lands: "Regarding merchants who now sail from Egypt...as far as the Ganges, they are only private citizens..." His comments are interesting as Roman beads and other materials are being found at Wari-Bateshwar ruins, the ancient city with roots from much earlier, before the Bronze Age, presently being slowly excavated beside the Old Brahmaputra in Bangladesh. Ptolemy's map of the Ganges Delta, a remarkably accurate effort, showed that his informants knew all about the course of the Brahmaputra River, crossing through the Himalayas then bending westward to its source in Tibet. It is doubtless that this delta was a major international trading center, almost certainly from much earlier than the Common Era. Gemstones and other merchandise from Thailand and Java were traded in the delta and through it. Chinese archaeological writer Bin Yang and some earlier writers and archaeologists, such as Janice Stargardt, strongly suggest this route of international trade as Sichuan–Yunnan–Burma–Bangladesh route. According to Bin Yang, especially from the 12th century the route was used to ship bullion from Yunnan (gold and silver are among the minerals in which Yunnan is rich), through northern Burma, into modern Bangladesh, making use of the ancient route, known as the 'Ledo' route. The emerging evidence of the ancient cities of Bangladesh, in particular Wari-Bateshwar ruins, Mahasthangarh, Bhitagarh, Bikrampur, Egarasindhur, and Sonargaon, are believed to be the international trade centers in this route.

Maritime route

Maritime Silk Road or Maritime Silk Route refer to the maritime section of historic Silk Road that connects China to Southeast Asia, Indonesian archipelago, Indian subcontinent, Arabian peninsula, all the way to Egypt and finally Europe.

The trade route encompassed numbers of bodies of waters; including South China Sea, Strait of Malacca, Indian Ocean, Gulf of Bengal, Arabian Sea, Persian Gulf, and the Red Sea. The maritime route overlaps with historic Southeast Asian maritime trade, Spice trade, Indian Ocean trade and after 8th century – the Arabian naval trade network. The network also extended eastward to East China Sea and Yellow Sea to connect China with Korean Peninsula and Japanese archipelago.

Expansion of religions

Richard Foltz, Xinru Liu, and others have described how trading activities along the Silk Road over many centuries facilitated the transmission not just of goods but also ideas and culture, notably in the area of religions. Zoroastrianism, Judaism, Buddhism, Christianity, Manichaeism, and Islam all spread across Eurasia through trade networks that were tied to specific religious communities and their institutions. Notably, established Buddhist monasteries along the Silk Road offered a haven, as well as a new religion for foreigners.

The spread of religions and cultural traditions along the Silk Roads, according to Jerry H. Bentley, also led to syncretism. One example was the encounter with the Chinese and Xiongnu nomads. These unlikely events of cross-cultural contact allowed both cultures to adapt to each other as an alternative. The Xiongnu adopted Chinese agricultural techniques, dress style, and lifestyle, while the Chinese adopted Xiongnu military techniques, some dress style, music, and dance. Perhaps most surprising of the cultural exchanges between China and the Xiongnu, Chinese soldiers sometimes defected and converted to the Xiongnu way of life, and stayed in the steppes for fear of punishment.

Nomadic mobility played a key role in facilitating inter-regional contacts and cultural exchanges along the ancient Silk Roads.

Transmission of Christianity

The transmission of Christianity was primarily known as Nestorianism on the Silk Road. In 781, an inscribed stele shows Nestorian Christian missionaries arriving on the Silk Road. Christianity had spread both east and west, simultaneously bringing Syriac language and evolving the forms of worship.

Transmission of Buddhism

The transmission of Buddhism to China via the Silk Road began in the 1st century CE, according to a semi-legendary account of an ambassador sent to the West by the Chinese Emperor Ming (58–75). During this period Buddhism began to spread throughout Southeast, East, and Central Asia. Mahayana, Theravada, and Tibetan Buddhism are the three primary forms of Buddhism that spread across Asia via the Silk Road.

The Buddhist movement was the first large-scale missionary movement in the history of world religions. Chinese missionaries were able to assimilate Buddhism, to an extent, to native Chinese Daoists, which brought the two beliefs together. Buddha's community of followers, the Sangha, consisted of male and female monks and laity. These people moved through India and beyond to spread the ideas of Buddha. As the number of members within the Sangha increased, it became costly so that only the larger cities were able to afford having the Buddha and his disciples visit. It is believed that under the control of the Kushans, Buddhism was spread to China and other parts of Asia from the middle of the first century to the middle of the third century. Extensive contacts started in the 2nd century, probably as a consequence of the expansion of the Kushan empire into the Chinese territory of the Tarim Basin, due to the missionary efforts of a great number of Buddhist monks to Chinese lands. The first missionaries and translators of Buddhists scriptures into Chinese were either Parthian, Kushan, Sogdian, or Kuchean.

One result of the spread of Buddhism along the Silk Road was displacement and conflict. The Greek Seleucids were exiled to Iran and Central Asia because of a new Iranian dynasty called the Parthians at the beginning of the 2nd century BCE, and as a result, the Parthians became the new middlemen for trade in a period when the Romans were major customers for silk. Parthian scholars were involved in one of the first-ever Buddhist text translations into the Chinese language. Its main trade centre on the Silk Road, the city of Merv, in due course and with the coming of age of Buddhism in China, became a major Buddhist centre by the middle of the 2nd century. Knowledge among people on the silk roads also increased when Emperor Ashoka of the Maurya dynasty (268–239 BCE) converted to Buddhism and raised the religion to official status in his northern Indian empire.

From the 4th century CE onward, Chinese pilgrims also started to travel on the Silk Road to India to get improved access to the original Buddhist scriptures, with Fa-hsien's pilgrimage to India (395–414), and later Xuanzang (629–644) and Hyecho, who traveled from Korea to India. The travels of the priest Xuanzang were fictionalized in the 16th century in a fantasy adventure novel called Journey to the West, which told of trials with demons and the aid given by various disciples on the journey.

There were many different schools of Buddhism travelling on the Silk Road. The Dharmaguptakas and the Sarvastivadins were two of the major Nikaya schools. These were both eventually displaced by the Mahayana, also known as "Great Vehicle". This movement of Buddhism first gained influence in the Khotan region. The Mahayana, which was more of a "pan-Buddhist movement" than a school of Buddhism, appears to have begun in northwestern India or Central Asia. It formed during the 1st century BCE and was small at first, and the origins of this "Greater Vehicle" are not fully clear. Some Mahayana scripts were found in northern Pakistan, but the main texts are still believed to have been composed in Central Asia along the Silk Road. These different schools and movements of Buddhism were a result of the diverse and complex influences and beliefs on the Silk Road. With the rise of Mahayana Buddhism, the initial direction of Buddhist development changed. This form of Buddhism highlighted, as stated by Xinru Liu, "the elusiveness of physical reality, including material wealth." It also stressed getting rid of material desire to a certain point; this was often difficult for followers to understand.

During the 5th and 6th centuries CE, merchants played a large role in the spread of religion, in particular Buddhism. Merchants found the moral and ethical teachings of Buddhism an appealing alternative to previous religions. As a result, merchants supported Buddhist monasteries along the Silk Road, and in return, the Buddhists gave the merchants somewhere to stay as they traveled from city to city. As a result, merchants spread Buddhism to foreign encounters as they traveled. Merchants also helped to establish diaspora within the communities they encountered, and over time their cultures became based on Buddhism. As a result, these communities became centers of literacy and culture with well-organized marketplaces, lodging, and storage. The voluntary conversion of Chinese ruling elites helped the spread of Buddhism in East Asia and led Buddhism to become widespread in Chinese society. The Silk Road transmission of Buddhism essentially ended around the 7th century with the rise of Islam in Central Asia.

Judaism on the Silk Road 
Adherents to the Jewish faith first began to travel eastward from Mesopotamia following the Persian conquest of Babylon in 559 by the armies of Cyrus the Great. Judean slaves freed after the Persian conquest of Babylon dispersed throughout the Persian Empire. Some Judeans could have traveled as far east as Bactria and Sogdia, though there is not clear evidence for this early settlement of Judeans. After settlement, it is likely that most Judeans took up trades in commerce. Trading along the silk trade networks by Judean merchants increased as the trade networks expanded. By the classical age, when trade goods traveled from as far east as China to as far west as Rome, Judean merchants in Central Asia would have been in an advantageous position to participate in trade along the Silk Road. A group of Judean merchants originating from Gaul known as the Radanites were one group of Judean merchants that had thriving trade networks from China to Rome. This trade was facilitated by a positive relationship the Radanites were able to foster with the Khazar Turks. The Khazar Turks served as a good spot in between China and Rome, and the Khazar Turks saw a relationship with the Radanites as a good commercial opportunity.

According to Richard Foltz "there is more evidence for Iranian influence on the formation of Jewish [religious] ideas than the reverse." Concepts of a paradise (heaven) for the good and a place of suffering (hell) for the wicked, and a form or world-ending apocalypse came from Iranian religious ideas, and this is supported by a lack of such ideas from pre-exile Judean sources. The origin of the devil is also said to come from the Iranian Angra Mainyu, an evil figure in Persian mythology.

Expansion of the arts

Many artistic influences were transmitted via the Silk Road, particularly through Central Asia, where Hellenistic, Iranian, Indian and Chinese influences could intermix. Greco-Buddhist art represents one of the most vivid examples of this interaction. Silk was also a representation of art, serving as a religious symbol. Most importantly, silk was used as currency for trade along the silk road.

These artistic influences can be seen in the development of Buddhism where, for instance, Buddha was first depicted as human in the Kushan period. Many scholars have attributed this to Greek influence. The mixture of Greek and Indian elements can be found in later Buddhist art in China and throughout countries on the Silk Road.

The production of art consisted of many different items that were traded along the Silk Roads from the East to the West. One common product, the lapis lazuli, was a blue stone with golden specks, which was used as paint after it was ground into powder.

Commemoration
On 22 June 2014, the United Nations Educational, Scientific and Cultural Organization (UNESCO) named the Silk Road a World Heritage Site at the 2014 Conference on World Heritage. The United Nations World Tourism Organization has been working since 1993 to develop sustainable international tourism along the route with the stated goal of fostering peace and understanding.

To commemorate the Silk Road becoming a UNESCO World Heritage Site, the China National Silk Museum announced a "Silk Road Week" to take place 19–25 June 2020.

There is also a Silk Road in Macclesfield, UK.

Gallery

See also

 Bronze Age
 Dvārakā–Kamboja route
 Dzungarian Gate
 Global silver trade from the 16th to 19th centuries
 Godavaya
 Hippie trail
 History of silk
 Incense Route
 Iron Age
 List of ports and harbours of the Indian Ocean
 Maritime Silk Road
 Mount Imeon
 One Belt One Road Initiative
 Serica
 Sericulture
 Silk Road Economic Belt
 Silk Road Fund
 Silk Road Numismatics
 Spice trade
 Silk Road Textiles
 Steppe Route
 Suez Canal
 Tea Horse Road
 The Silk Roads
 Three hares

References

Citations

Sources

 Baines, John and Málek, Jaromir (1984). Atlas of Ancient Egypt. Oxford, Time Life Books.
 Boulnois, Luce (2004). Silk Road: Monks, Warriors & Merchants on the Silk Road. Translated by Helen Loveday with additional material by Bradley Mayhew and Angela Sheng. Airphoto International.  hardback,  softback.
 Ebrey, Patricia Buckley. (1999). The Cambridge Illustrated History of China. Cambridge: Cambridge University Press. .
 Foltz, Richard, Religions of the Silk Road, Palgrave Macmillan, 2nd edition, 2010, 
 Harmatta, János, ed., 1994. History of civilizations of Central Asia, Volume II. The development of sedentary and nomadic civilizations: 700 BC to 250. Paris, UNESCO Publishing.
 Herodotus (5th century BCE): Histories. Translated with notes by George Rawlinson. 1996 edition. Ware, Hertfordshire, Wordsworth Editions Limited.
 Hopkirk, Peter: Foreign Devils on the Silk Road: The Search for the Lost Cities and Treasures of Chinese Central Asia. The University of Massachusetts Press, Amherst, 1980, 1984. 
 Hill, John E. (2009) Through the Jade Gate to Rome: A Study of the Silk Routes during the Later Han Dynasty, 1st to 2nd centuries CE. BookSurge, Charleston, South Carolina. .
 Hulsewé, A.F.P. and Loewe, M.A.N. (1979). China in Central Asia: The Early Stage 125 BC – 23: an annotated translation of chapters 61 and 96 of the History of the Former Han Dynasty. E.J. Brill, Leiden.
 Huyghe, Edith and Huyghe, François-Bernard: "La route de la soie ou les empires du mirage", Petite bibliothèque Payot, 2006, 
 Juliano, Annette, L. and Lerner, Judith A., et al. 2002. Monks and Merchants: Silk Road Treasures from Northwest China: Gansu and Ningxia, 4th–7th Century. Harry N. Abrams Inc., with The Asia Society. .
 Klimkeit, Hans-Joachim (1988). Die Seidenstrasse: Handelsweg and Kulturbruecke zwischen Morgen- and Abendland. Koeln: DuMont Buchverlag.
 Klimkeit, Hans-Joachim (1993). Gnosis on the Silk Road: Gnostic Texts from Central Asia. Trans. & presented by Hans-Joachim Klimkeit. HarperSanFrancisco. .
 Knight, E.F. (1893). Where Three Empires Meet: A Narrative of Recent Travel in: Kashmir, Western Tibet, Gilgit, and the adjoining countries. Longmans, Green, and Co., London. Reprint: Ch'eng Wen Publishing Company, Taipei. 1971.
 Li, Rongxi (translator). 1995. A Biography of the Tripiṭaka Master of the Great Ci'en Monastery of the Great Tang Dynasty. Numata Center for Buddhist Translation and Research. Berkeley, California. 
 Li, Rongxi (translator). 1995. The Great Tang Dynasty Record of the Western Regions. Numata Center for Buddhist Translation and Research. Berkeley, California. 
 Litvinsky, B.A., ed. (1996). History of civilizations of Central Asia, Volume III. The crossroads of civilizations: 250 to 750. Paris, UNESCO Publishing.
 Liu, Xinru (2001). "Migration and Settlement of the Yuezhi-Kushan: Interaction and Interdependence of Nomadic and Sedentary Societies." Journal of World History, Volume 12, No. 2, Fall 2001. University of Hawaii Press, pp. 261–92. Project MUSE - Journal of World History.
 Liu, Li, 2004, The Chinese Neolithic, Trajectories to Early States, Cambridge: Cambridge University Press.
 Liu, Xinru (2010). The Silk Road in World History. Oxford University Press. .
 McDonald, Angus (1995). The Five Foot Road: In Search of a Vanished China., San Francisco: HarperCollins
 Malkov, Artemy (2007). The Silk Road: A mathematical model. History & Mathematics, ed. by Peter Turchin et al. Moscow: KomKniga. 
 Mallory, J.P. and Mair, Victor H. (2000). The Tarim Mummies: Ancient China and the Mystery of the Earliest Peoples from the West. Thames & Hudson, London.
 Ming Pao. "Hong Kong proposes Silk Road on the Sea as World Heritage", 7 August 2005, p. A2.
 Osborne, Milton, 1975. River Road to China: The Mekong River Expedition, 1866–73. George Allen & Unwin Lt.
 Puri, B.N, 1987 Buddhism in Central Asia, Motilal Banarsidass Publishers Private Limited, Delhi. (2000 reprint).
 Ray, Himanshu Prabha, 2003. The Archaeology of Seafaring in Ancient South Asia. Cambridge University Press. .
 Sarianidi, Viktor, 1985. The Golden Hoard of Bactria: From the Tillya-tepe Excavations in Northern Afghanistan. Harry N. Abrams, New York.
 Schafer, Edward H. 1963. The Golden Peaches of Samarkand: A study of T'ang Exotics. University of California Press. Berkeley and Los Angeles. 1st paperback edition: 1985. .
 Stein, Aurel M. 1907. Ancient Khotan: Detailed report of archaeological explorations in Chinese Turkestan, 2 vols. Clarendon Press. Oxford.National Institute of Informatics / Digital Archive of Toyo Bunko Rare Books - Digital Silk Road Project
 Stein, Aurel M., 1912. Ruins of Desert Cathay: Personal narrative of explorations in Central Asia and westernmost China, 2 vols. Reprint: Delhi. Low Price Publications. 1990.
 Stein, Aurel M., 1921. Serindia: Detailed report of explorations in Central Asia and westernmost China, 5 vols. London & Oxford. Clarendon Press. Reprint: Delhi. Motilal Banarsidass. 1980.National Institute of Informatics / Digital Archive of Toyo Bunko Rare Books - Digital Silk Road Project
 Stein Aurel M., 1928. Innermost Asia: Detailed report of explorations in Central Asia, Kan-su and Eastern Iran, 5 vols. Clarendon Press. Reprint: New Delhi. Cosmo Publications. 1981.
 Stein Aurel M., 1932 On Ancient Central Asian Tracks: Brief Narrative of Three Expeditions in Innermost Asia and Northwestern China. Reprinted with Introduction by Jeannette Mirsky. Book Faith India, Delhi. 1999.
 Thorsten, Marie. 2006 "Silk Road Nostalgia and Imagined Global Community". Comparative American Studies 3, no. 3: 343–59.
 Waugh, Daniel. (2007). "Richthofen "Silk Roads": Toward the Archeology of a Concept." The Silk Road. Volume 5, Number 1, Summer 2007, pp. 1–10.  
 von Le Coq, Albert, 1928. Buried Treasures of Turkestan. Reprint with Introduction by Peter Hopkirk, Oxford University Press. 1985.
 Whitfield, Susan, 1999. Life Along the Silk Road. London: John Murray.
 Wimmel, Kenneth, 1996. The Alluring Target: In Search of the Secrets of Central Asia. Trackless Sands Press, Palo Alto, CA. 
 Yan, Chen, 1986. "Earliest Silk Route: The Southwest Route." Chen Yan. China Reconstructs, Vol. XXXV, No. 10. October 1986, pp. 59–62.

Further reading

 Boulnois, Luce. Silk Road: Monks, Warriors and Merchants on the Silk Road. Odyssey Publications, 2005. 
 Bulliet, Richard W. 1975. The Camel and the Wheel. Harvard University Press. .
 
 de la Vaissière, E., Sogdian Traders. A History, Leiden, Brill, 2005, Hardback  Brill Publishers, French version  on Home | De Boccard
 Elisseeff, Vadime. Editor. 1998. The Silk Roads: Highways of Culture and Commerce. UNESCO Publishing. Paris. Reprint: 2000.  softback; .
 Forbes, Andrew ; Henley, David (2011). China's Ancient Tea Horse Road. Chiang Mai: Cognoscenti Books. 
 Frankopan, Peter. The Silk Roads: A New History of the World (2016), Very wide-ranging scholarly survey, albeit without any maps.
 Hansen, Valerie. The Silk Road: A New History (Oxford University Press; 2012) 304 pages; Combines archaeology and history in a study of seven oases
 Hallikainen, Saana: Connections from Europe to Asia and how the trading was affected by the cultural exchange (2002)
 Hill, John E. (2004). The Peoples of the West from the Weilüe 魏略 by Yu Huan 魚豢: A Third Century Chinese Account Composed between 239 and 265. Draft annotated English translation. Weilue: The Peoples of the West
 Hopkirk, Peter: The Great Game: The Struggle for Empire in Central Asia; Kodansha International, New York, 1990, 1992.
 Kuzmina, E.E. The Prehistory of the Silk Road. (2008) Edited by Victor H. Mair. University of Pennsylvania Press, Philadelphia. 
 Larsen, Jeanne. Silk Road: A Novel of Eighth-Century China. (1989; reprinted 2009)
 
 Li et al. "Evidence that a West-East admixed population lived in the Tarim Basin as early as the early Bronze Age". BMC Biology 2010, 8:15.
 Liu, Xinru, and Shaffer, Lynda Norene. 2007. Connections Across Eurasia: Transportation, Communication, and Cultural Exchange on the Silk Roads. McGraw Hill, New York. .
 Miller, Roy Andrew (1959): Accounts of Western Nations in the History of the Northern Chou Dynasty. University of California Press.
 
 Polo, Marco, Il Milione.
 Thubron, C., The Silk Road to China (Hamlyn, 1989)
 Tuladhar, Kamal Ratna (2011). Caravan to Lhasa: A Merchant of Kathmandu in Traditional Tibet. Kathmandu: Lijala & Tisa. 
 
 Weber, Olivier, Eternal Afghanistan (photographs of Reza), (Unesco-Le Chêne, 2002)
 Yap, Joseph P. Wars With the Xiongnu – A Translation From Zizhi Tongjian. AuthorHouse (2009) 
 National Institute of Informatics – Digital Silk Road Project Digital Archive of Toyo Bunko Rare Books 
 Digital Silk Road > Toyo Bunko Archive > List of Books

External links

 Silk Road Atlas (University of Washington)
 The Silk Road, a historical overview by Oliver Wild
 The Silk Road Journal, a freely available scholarly journal run by Daniel Waugh
 The New Silk Road – a lecture by Paul Lacourbe at TEDxDanubia 2013
 Escobar, Pepe (February 2015). Year of the Sheep, Century of the Dragon? New Silk Roads and the Chinese Vision of a Brave New (Trade) World, an essay at Tom Dispatch

 
Ancient roads and tracks
Roads in Asia
Medieval Asia
Silk
Trade routes
Eurasian history
History of Imperial China
History of foreign trade in China
History of international relations
Ancient international relations
International road networks
Ancient history of Afghanistan
Ancient history of Iraq
Ancient history of Pakistan
Han dynasty
Economic history of Iran
Foreign trade of Pakistan
Foreign relations of ancient Rome
History of Khorasan
World Heritage Sites in China
World Heritage Sites in Kazakhstan
World Heritage Sites in Tajikistan